Donald Kenneth Schwab (December 6, 1918 – February 19, 2005) was a United States Army veteran of World War II and recipient of the U.S. Medal of Honor.

According to his official Medal of Honor online biography:

Schwab was awarded the Army Medal of Honor posthumously by President Barack Obama in a March 18, 2014 ceremony in the White House. Schwab's award came through the Defense Authorization Act which called in 2002 for a review of approximately 600 mostly Jewish American and Hispanic American veterans of World War II, the Korean War and the Vietnam War to ensure that no prejudice was shown to those deserving the Medal of Honor. Schwab was among five additional service members who the review identified as having been overlooked for the honor.

See also

List of Medal of Honor recipients for World War II

References

External links

1918 births
2005 deaths
United States Army personnel of World War II
People from Hooper, Nebraska
United States Army Medal of Honor recipients
United States Army officers
World War II recipients of the Medal of Honor